The Accreditation Commission for Health Care (ACHC) is a United States non-profit health care accrediting organization. It represents an alternative to the Joint Commission and CHAP, The Community Health Accreditation Program.

ACHC was established in 1985 by home care health providers to create an accreditation option which was more focused on the needs of small providers. The process began in Raleigh, North Carolina, with the group incorporated in August 1986. The first accredited organization was awarded certification in January 1987. The company began offering services on a national level in 1996. Today, ACHC offers nine accredited programs, three of which are CMS approved (Home Health, Hospice, DMEPOS).
 Home Health
 Hospice
 Private Duty
 DMEPOS
 Pharmacy
PCAB
 Sleep
 Behavioral Health
Ambulatory Care

The Accreditation process follows a three-year accreditation cycle. The process allows for organizations to learn best practices to better serve its client base. The accreditation process starts with the organization looking at their policies and procedures and adding them to the Preliminary Evidence Report (PER) for ACHC to review.  One of their surveyors will review and give required changes.  Within 3–7 months an unannounced survey will take place. Once completed the organization may have some changes to make through a Plan of Correction (PoC).  If the PoC is accepted the organization will be fully accredited and rewarded with the full benefits of ACHC Accreditation, they tend to be high rated

In early 2013, ACHC moved to its all-new headquarters in Cary, North Carolina. It welcomed its new CEO, José Domingos, and it launched its Behavioral Health Program.

CMS/Regulatory
In November 2006, the Centers for Medicare & Medicaid Services (CMS) approved ACHC to accredit suppliers of durable medical equipment, prosthetics, orthotics and supplies (DMEPOS) as meeting new quality standards under Medicare Part B.

In January 2009, the Centers for Medicare & Medicaid Services (CMS) announced the approval of the ACHC for continued Deeming Authority for Home Health Agencies through 2015. Initial approval of Deeming Authority of ACHC for Home Health Agencies was granted in February 2006.

On November 27, 2009, ACHC was recognized by the Centers for Medicare & Medicaid Services (CMS) as a national accreditation organization for Hospices that request participation in the Medicare program.

See also
International healthcare accreditation
List of healthcare accreditation organisations in the United States
Patient safety
Patient safety organization

References

External links
Official web page
BioRx Completes Accreditation With The Accreditation Commission For Health Care, Inc

Healthcare accreditation organizations in the United States
Medical and health organizations based in North Carolina
Medicare and Medicaid (United States)
Non-profit organizations based in North Carolina